Budapest's Inner City Parish Church (Budapest-Belvárosi Nagyboldogasszony), officially the Church of the Blessed Virgin Mary, is the main parish church of Budapest. It is often referred to as the City Parish Church, or Downtown Parish Church.

Location
Downtown Parish Church is located adjacent to the walls of the Roman Contra-Aquincum Fortress and the Elisabeth Bridge.

History
The earliest features of the church date back to the Romanesque period. In 1046, St. Gellért (Gerard), Bishop of Csanád, was buried there.

14th-century King Sigismund of Hungary initiated its reconstruction in Gothic style. During the reign of King Matthias, two additional lateral aisles were added.

It was used as a mosque in Turkish times and a mihrab from this period is still visible in the south-eastern wall of the sanctuary.

After a fire in 1723, it was restored between 1725 and 1739 in Baroque style, under the direction of the master builder János György Pauer (1692-1752). In 1828, István Kultsár (born in 1760), the great Hungarian theater promoter of the Enlightenment era, was entombed in the church's vault. In 1839, it was built with stalls selling the buttresses, which were dismantled in 1932. This brought back to light the Gothic windows and the twin bed.

The church was restored several times: by János Hild between 1805 and 1808, Imre Steindl in 1889, and Lászlo Gerő after 1945. The  interior murals were restored in 1976–77. In 2010, in the parlor of the sanctuary behind the sanctuary, an Anjou-era (14th–century) throne of Virgin Mary was found, surprisingly intact. The exterior of the church was neglected until the facade was renovated in 2011 after the renovation of the park before it, executed by Hungarian architect Mezős Tamás.

During the archaeological excavations carried out between 2014 and 2016, the camp commander's room was accessed and a sub-church was built. After the renovation, on August 15, 2016, the church was handed over to the faithful and visitors by Dr. Péter Erdő.

When the Elisabeth Bridge was being rebuilt after destruction during World War II, the Communist government of Hungary sought to demolish the church, but the Church, through astute negotiation with the Communist authorities, managed to save this historic treasure.

See also
 List of Jesuit sites

Roman Catholic churches in Budapest
11th-century Roman Catholic church buildings
Roman Catholic churches completed in 1905
Catholic Church in Hungary
Landmarks in Hungary
History of Budapest
20th-century Roman Catholic church buildings in Hungary